The ATEC 122 Zephyr 2000 is a Czech ultralight aircraft, designed by Oldrich Olansky and produced by ATEC v.o.s. of Libice nad Cidlinou. The aircraft is supplied as a complete ready-to-fly-aircraft or as a kit for amateur construction.

Design and development
The Zephyr was designed to comply with the Fédération Aéronautique Internationale microlight rules. It features a cantilever low-wing, a two-seats-in-side-by-side configuration enclosed cockpit under a bubble canopy, fixed tricycle landing gear, a T-tail and a single engine in tractor configuration.

The aircraft's fuselage is made from composites with wooden bulkheads. The semi-tapered  span wing is made from plywood with composite spars and leading edges and employs a UA-2 airfoil. The wing is covered with doped aircraft fabric. The standard engine factory-supplied was the  Rotax 912ULS four-stroke powerplant.

The Zephyr is noted for its low payload.

The Zephyr was later developed into the ATEC 321 Faeta.

Variants
Zephyr 2000
base model for FAI microlight category.
Zephyr 2550
Light-sport aircraft model

Specifications (122 Zephyr 2000)

References

External links

2000s Czech ultralight aircraft
Light-sport aircraft
Single-engined tractor aircraft
ATEC aircraft